Thomas McIntosh was a Scottish footballer who played in the Football League for The Wednesday.

References

Date of birth unknown
Date of death unknown
Scottish footballers
English Football League players
Association football forwards
Linthouse F.C. players
Clyde F.C. players
Sheffield Wednesday F.C. players